The Tomkins Medal (officially called the H. W. Tomkins Memorial Medal) was an Australian rules football honour awarded from 1939 to 2008 to the fairest and most brilliant player in the South Australian National Football League (SANFL) under-19 competition, as judged by field umpires. It was named after Horace W. (Dick) Tomkins, past League administrator, League life member, junior football ambassador and Secretary of the West Torrens Football Club.  From 1936 to 1938, the award was known as the O'Halloran Medal.

Winners

O'Halloran Medal

Tomkins Medal

References 

Australian rules football awards
South Australian National Football League
Awards established in 1939
Awards disestablished in 2008